Bnei Yehuda Ground was a football ground in south-east Tel Aviv, near Hatikva Quarter, Tel Aviv, Israel. The ground was in use between 1944 and 1951 and was abandoned when it was built over.

See also
Sports in Israel

References

Defunct football venues in Israel
Bnei Yehuda Tel Aviv F.C.
Sports venues in Tel Aviv